Aleksandr Vladimirovich Kolomeytsev (born 21 February 1989) is a former Russian professional football player who played as a centre midfielder.

Club career
He made his Russian Premier League debut for FC Amkar Perm on 15 August 2010 in a game against FC Lokomotiv Moscow. After 5 seasons with Amkar, he signed with FC Lokomotiv Moscow.

He retired on 29 July 2020.

Honours

Club
Lokomotiv Moscow
Russian Premier League: 2017–18
Russian Cup: 2016–17

Career statistics

Club

Notes

References

1989 births
People from Surgut
Living people
Russian footballers
Association football midfielders
Russia under-21 international footballers
Russia national football B team footballers
FC Torpedo Moscow players
FC Amkar Perm players
Russian Premier League players
FC Lokomotiv Moscow players
FC Moscow players
FC Sportakademklub Moscow players